The World Cup: A Captain's Tale is a 1982 British television sports film directed by Tom Clegg and starring Dennis Waterman, Andrew Keir, Marjorie Bland, Nigel Hawthorne and Tim Healy. The film depicts the story of West Auckland F.C. a team of part-time players who represented England in the Sir Thomas Lipton Trophy, sometimes described as the "First World Cup", in 1909 and 1911.
Some of the process behind filming is mentioned in a Dennis Waterman tribute issued by The Minder Podcast in 2022.

Cast
 Andrew Keir as Sir Thomas Lipton
 Richard Griffiths as Sidney Barron
 Dennis Waterman as Bob Jones
 Nigel Hawthorne as John Westwood
 Marjorie Bland as Edie Jones
 Dai Bradley as Ticer Thomas
 Tim Healy as Charlie Hogg
 Ken Hutchison as Jimmy Dickenson
 Rod Culbertson as Rob Gill
 Struan Rodger as Jack Greenwell
 Lloyd McGuire as Tom Gill
 Jimmy Yuill (uncredited)

References

External links

1982 television films
1982 films
British television films
British association football films
Sports films based on actual events
Television series by ITV Studios
1908–09 in European football
1910–11 in European football
1908–09 in Italian football
1908–09 in English football
1910–11 in Italian football
1910–11 in English football
Films directed by Tom Clegg (director)
1980s English-language films
1980s British films